The AN/PVS-14 Monocular Night Vision Device (MNVD) is in widespread use by the United States Armed Forces as well as NATO allies around the world. It uses a third generation image intensifier tube, and is primarily manufactured by Litton Industries (Now L-3 Warrior Systems) and Elbit Systems of America (formerly Harris Night Vision, formerly Exelis, formerly ITT). It is often used 'hands free' using a head harness or attached to a combat helmet such as the PASGT, MICH TC-2000 Combat Helmet, Advanced Combat Helmet, Marine Lightweight Helmet or IHPS. It can also be used as a weapons night sight. In addition, it was part of the equipment fielded in the U.S. Army's Land Warrior program. Morovision Night Vision was the law enforcement distributor of the NEPVS-14 for ITT.

The designation AN/PVS translates to Army/Navy Portable Visual Search, according to Joint Electronics Type Designation System guidelines.

 Film: Thin-Film
 Gate: Auto-Gated
 Brightness Gain: Adjustable from 25 to more than 3000 fL/fc
 Magnification: 1×
 Objective Lens: f/1.2
 Eyepiece Lens: EFL 26 mm
 Diopter Adjustment: +2 to −6
 Range of Focus: 25 cm to infinity
 Voltage Required: 1.5 Volts
 Operating Temperature: −51 °C to +49 °C
 Storage Temperature: −51 °C to +49 °C

See also
AN/PVS-7
AN/PVS-15
AN/PSQ-20

References

External links

 Night Optics and Observation Theory 

Military electronics of the United States
Night vision devices
United States Marine Corps equipment
Military equipment introduced in the 2000s